{{Infobox animanga/Print
| type            = manga
| author          = Itachi
| publisher       = Square Enix
| publisher_en    = 
| demographic     = Shōnen
| magazine        = Manga Up!
| first           = July 2, 2022
| last            = 
| volumes         = 1
| volume_list     = #Manga
}}Engage Kiss is a Japanese mixed-media project created by Aniplex. It consists of a manga series, which began serialization in Manga Up! in July 2022, and an anime television series produced by A-1 Pictures and written by Fumiaki Maruto, with character designs by Tsunako, which aired from July to September 2022. A mobile game follow-up and sequel is developed by Square Enix under the title Engage Kill.

Plot
Bayron City, an artificial island located in the Pacific Ocean near Japan, is troubled by the mysterious appearance of demons. To conceal their existence from the public, the city government hires PMCs that combat and neutralize demon-like monsters called "D-Hazards".

One such PMC called "I&S Office" is ran by the protagonist, Shu Ogata. Differing from other PMCs, Shu's only employee is a demon girl named Kisara. Kisara has the appearance of a young girl despite being hundreds of years old, and her combat strength is highly rated. Though Shu does little work and is constantly in need of money, Kisara seems affectionate for him and toils to support him.

Despite Shu's close ties to Kisara, he frequently contacts his ex-girlfriend Ayano Yugiri for help. Ayano and Shu used to work for the same PMC called "AAA Defender Co." until their breakup and Shu's departure from AAA. Ayano claims that their relationship has ended, yet she still acquiesces to Shu's pleas for help.

Shu appears to be a loser whose livelihood depends on his relationships with two women. However, he has an ambitious goal: to uncover the truth behind the D-Hazard incident long ago in which his parents and sister went missing.

Characters
Engage Kiss

The protagonist who runs a small private military company. He is usually broke as he cannot handle finances well. He is an orphan, as the rest of his family is presumed to be dead after an incident prior to the events of the series.

A young girl who goes to a high school in Bayron City. She is actually a demon girl who is hundreds of years old. She has the ability to eat the memories of people, including Shu.

Shu's first ex-girlfriend. Although she and Shu have broken up, she still has feelings for him. She is also Akino's daughter. She is slightly older than Shu, and they met when they were both children.

Shu's second ex-girlfriend, who dresses as a nun. She is actually an assassin and a part of an international organization tasked with fight against D-Hazards.

Shu's younger sister. She is also a part-demon girl. Later on in the series, she is freed from an underground area where she was trapped, but ends up fighting Kisara and the others due to her powers. After she is defeated she starts living with Shu.

Ayano's mother and the chairman of a private military company. She was previously Shu's boss, and continues to support him even after his departure from her company.

A private military officer in Bayron City. Shu looked up to him as a father figure, but later on he became possessed by demons and tries to kill Shu.

Engage Kill

Media
Anime
The anime was first labeled as "Project Engage", which listed Fumiaki Maruto (author of Saekano) and Tsunako (Date A Live illustrator) as the main staff. The details were then announced through the Aniplex booth at the AnimeJapan 2022 event. The series, titled Engage Kiss, is produced by A-1 Pictures and directed by Tomoya Tanaka, with Shunsaku Yano in charge of world setting, Shinpei Wada adapting Megumi Katagiri's demon designs for animation, and Yoshiaki Fujisawa composing the music. It aired from July 3 to September 25, 2022, on Tokyo MX and other channels. The opening theme song, is performed by Halca. The ending theme song, is performed by Akari Nanawo. Crunchyroll licensed the series outside of Asia for an English simulcast and simuldub.

Episode list

Manga
A manga adaptation of Engage Kiss by Itachi began serialization in Square Enix's online manga magazine Manga Up! on July 2, 2022.

Game
A mobile game title developed by Square Enix titled Engage Kill was announced on April 24, 2022. It was released in Japan on March 1, 2023. The game is a free-to-play RPG genre title with in-app purchases.

See also
 Saekano, a light novel series authored by Fumiaki Maruto
 Date A Live, a light novel series illustrated by Tsunako
 Haganai'', a manga series illustrated by Itachi

Notes

References

External links
 Project official website 
 Manga official website 
 Anime official website 
 Game official website 
 

2022 anime television series debuts
2023 video games
A-1 Pictures
Action video games
Android (operating system) games
Animated television series about monsters
Anime and manga about revenge
Anime with original screenplays
Aniplex franchises
Bandai Namco franchises
Comics set in a fictional country
Crunchyroll anime
Demons in anime and manga
Fiction about government
Fiction about monsters
Gangan Comics manga
IOS games
Japan-exclusive video games
Japanese role-playing video games
Mass media franchises
Military anime and manga
Mobile games
Multiplayer video games
Romantic comedy anime and manga
Shōnen manga
Square Enix franchises
Square Enix games
Taito games
Television shows set in Asia
Television series set in fictional countries
Television series set in the future
Tokyo MX original programming
Video games featuring female protagonists
Video games set in a fictional country
Video games set in the future
War in anime and manga
World War III video games